Mesocortex (also called juxtallocortex) is the transitional areas of the cerebral cortex, formed at borders between true isocortex and true allocortex (either paleocortex or archicortex). Parts of mesocortex that lie closer to the true isocortex and have more resemblance to the isocortex in their cytoarchitectonics and histology, are called proisocortex. Parts of mesocortex that lie closer to the true allocortex and have more resemblance to the allocortex in their cytoarchitectonics and histology, are called periallocortex (peripaleocortex or periarchicortex depending on the allocortex type with which a given area of isocortex borders).

Mesocortex is essentially the same as paralimbic cortex, as all those mesocortical transitional areas are found exclusively in paralimbic region, and vice versa - all the paralimbic region consists of cortex that is transitional by its nature (in its embryonic and phylogenetic origins) and by its histological structure and cytoarchitectonics. But the term "mesocortex" represents a concept that is different from the concept behind the term "paralimbic cortex". The mesocortex is defined on the basis of its cytoarchitectonics and histology, while the paralimbic cortex is the cortical areas that lie close to the subcortical limbic structures or over them.

There was also a hypothesis that the cortex should be viewed as concentric rings of allocortex, mesocortex (periallocortex and proisocortex) and true isocortex.

See also
 Limbic system

References

Neuroanatomy
Cerebrum